Ought was a post-punk band from Montreal, Quebec, Canada. The band consisted of Tim Darcy (vocals, guitar), Ben Stidworthy (bass), Matt May (keyboards) and Tim Keen (drums).

History 
Ought formed in 2011 when its members began living together in a communal band practice space and recorded their earliest material. Their debut EP, New Calm, was released in 2012. After signing with Constellation Records, they released a full-length, More than Any Other Day, in 2014. The album achieved critical acclaim, including a Best New Music accolade from Pitchfork Media. It was noted in numerous year-end lists for 2014 including Rolling Stone, Pitchfork, Drowned In Sound, Loud and Quiet, Exclaim!, Crack Magazine, and Paste. The album reached #20 on the Billboard Heatseekers chart in the United States.

In October 2014, the band released Once More with Feeling, an EP featuring B-sides from More Than Any Other Day and re-recordings of earlier songs. Sun Coming Down, the band's second full-length album, was released in September 2015.

The band worked with French producer Nicolas Vernhes on their third studio album, Room Inside the World, which was released February 16, 2018.

Ought announced their disbandment in November 2021. A new band with Darcy and Stidworthy as members, Cola, was announced on the same day, along with the release of their debut single "Blank Curtain."

Side projects
Lead singer Tim Darcy released his debut solo album, Saturday Night, in 2017.

Members
Tim Darcy – guitars, vocals
Matt May – keyboards
Ben Stidworthy – bass
Tim Keen – drums, violin

Discography
Studio albums
More than Any Other Day (Constellation Records, 2014)
Sun Coming Down (Constellation Records, 2015)
Room Inside the World (Merge Records / Royal Mountain Records, 2018)

EPs
New Calm (self-released, 2012)
Once More With Feeling EP (Constellation Records, 2014)
Four Desires (Merge Records, 2018)

References
Footnotes

Further reading
Biography at AllMusic
Review at Rolling Stone
Review  at Drowned in Sound

External links
Label Site at Merge Records

Canadian indie rock groups
Constellation Records (Canada) artists
Musical groups from Montreal
Canadian post-punk music groups
Musical quartets
Musical groups established in 2011
Musical groups disestablished in 2021
2011 establishments in Quebec
2021 disestablishments in Quebec
Merge Records artists